The 2017 Belarusian Premier League was the 27th season of top-tier football in Belarus. The season began on 1 April 2017 and ended on 26 November 2017. BATE Borisov were the defending champions, having won their 11th consecutive league title and 13th overall last year, and successfully defended their crown.

Teams

The bottom two teams from the 2016 season, Granit Mikashevichi and Belshina Bobruisk, were relegated to the 2017 Belarusian First League. They were replaced by Gomel and Dnepr Mogilev, champions and runners-up of the 2016 Belarusian First League respectively.

Source: Scoresway

League table

Results
Each team plays home-and-away once against every other team for a total of 30 matches played each.

Top goalscorers
Updated to the final standing Source: football.by

See also
2017 Belarusian First League
2016–17 Belarusian Cup
2017–18 Belarusian Cup

References

External links
 

2017
Belarus
Belarus
1